Akshamsaddin (Muhammad Shams al-Din bin Hamzah) (1389, Damascus – 16 February 1459, Göynük, Bolu), was an influential Ottoman Sunni Muslim scholar, poet, and mystic saint.

Biography
He was the grandson of Shahab al-Din al-Suhrawardi and a descendant of Abu Bakr al-Siddiq. He was an influential tutor and adviser to Sultan Mehmed the Conqueror. After completing his work with his master Sheikh Hacı Bayram-ı Veli, he founded the Shamsiyya-Bayramiyya Sufi order. He discovered the lost grave of Abu Ayyub al-Ansari (the companion of Muhammad) in Constantinople preceding the Siege of Constantinople.

In addition to his fame in religious sciences and Tasawwuf, Akshemsaddin was popular in the fields of medicine and pharmacology. There is not much reference to how he acquired this knowledge, but the Orientalist Elias John Wilkinson Gibb notes in his work History of Ottoman Poetry that Akshamsaddin learned from Haji Bayram Wali during his years with him. Akshamsaddin was also knowledgeable in the treatment of psychological and spiritual disorders. Akshamsaddin mentioned the microbe in his work Maddat ul-Hayat (The Material of Life) about two centuries prior to Antonie van Leeuwenhoek's discovery through experimentation:

Works
 Risalat an-Nuriya
 Khall-e Mushkilat
 Maqamat-e Awliya
 Kitab ut-Tib
 Maddat ul-Hayat

References

Abu Ayyub al-Ansari
Abu Bakr
Bayramiye order
Turkish Muslims
15th-century Muslim scholars of Islam
15th-century Muslim theologians
Ottoman Sufis
Turkish Sufis
Sunni Sufis
Sunni Muslim scholars of Islam
15th-century writers from the Ottoman Empire
1389 births
1459 deaths
Microbiology
15th-century poets from the Ottoman Empire
Mehmed the Conqueror
Male poets from the Ottoman Empire
Scientists from the Ottoman Empire